US SIF: The Forum for Sustainable and Responsible Investment is a United States-based membership association located in Washington, DC that advances sustainable investing across all asset classes. US SIF members, representing $5 trillion in assets under management or advisement, include investment management and advisory firms, mutual fund companies, asset owners, data and research firms, financial planners and advisors, broker-dealers, banks, credit unions, community development financial institutions and non-profit associations.

US SIF was formerly known as the Social Investment Forum. It changed its name on June 9, 2011. US SIF is a member of the Global Sustainable Investment Alliance.

US SIF is supported in its work by the US SIF Foundation, a 501(C)(3) organization that undertakes educational, research and programmatic activities to advance the mission of US SIF, such as offering online and live courses for different audiences, including advisors, other financial professionals and individual investors.

Education 
The US SIF Foundation's Center for Sustainable Investment Education provides education, research and thought leadership on sustainable investment to investors, investment advisors, consultants and analysts.

Resources provided by the Center for Sustainable Investment Education include, among others:

 Online and live courses for different audiences, including advisors, other financial professionals and individual investors
 Fact sheets on the basics of sustainable and impact investment
 A breadth of high-quality research publications including the biennial report on US Sustainable and Impact Investing Trends

Public policy 
The US SIF Public Policy Program supports an agenda that advances sustainable investment to the national legislative and executive branches of government. Through US SIF, the sustainable investment industry brings a distinct voice and set of priorities to legislative and regulatory initiatives. Establishing standards for reporting and ESG analysis will likely need regulatory changes.

US SIF organizes a Policy and Advocacy Training and Capitol Hill Day for attendees of its annual conference. Members learn of current and central public policies related to sustainable and impact investing, and have the opportunity to meet their Senators and members of the House of Representatives.

Events 
US SIF has organized an annual conference since 2011. Conferences are focused on a broad range of environmental, social and governance issues, centered on substantive sessions and networking opportunities.

The event draws representatives of investment management and advisory firms, asset owners, research firms, financial planners and advisors, broker-dealers, and community development institutions, along with policymakers and corporate leaders.

US SIF also organizes webinars and other virtual events about its latest research publications, public policy updates, and other developments in the sustainable investment field.

References 

Finance in the United States
Ethical investment